The Athletics at the 2016 Summer Paralympics – Men's 400 metres T52 event at the 2016 Paralympic Games took place on 12–13 September 2016, at the Estádio Olímpico João Havelange.

Heats

Heat 1 
10:00 12 September 2016:

Heat 2 
10:08 12 September 2016:

Final 
10:20 13 September 2016:

Notes

Athletics at the 2016 Summer Paralympics
2016 in men's athletics